Åshild Haugland (born 26 November 1986) is a Norwegian politician for the Progress Party.

She served as a deputy representative to the Parliament of Norway from Aust-Agder during the term 2009–2013.

She has been a member of Arendal municipal council.

References

1986 births
Living people
People from Arendal
Deputy members of the Storting
Progress Party (Norway) politicians
Aust-Agder politicians
Women members of the Storting
Place of birth missing (living people)
21st-century Norwegian politicians